Monique Roy Verville (born April 27, 1961 in Verdun, Quebec) is a politician from Quebec, Canada. Her surname is "Roy Verville". She was an Action démocratique du Québec Member of the National Assembly for the electoral district of La Prairie from 2007 to 2008.

She was the owner of a daycare center in Cold Lake, Alberta as well as in a military base in Germany. She also worked on numerous occasions with people with disabilities.
 
She was first elected in the 2007 election with 34% of the vote. Parti Québécois candidate François Rebello finished second with 31% of the vote, followed by Liberal incumbent Jean Dubuc (29%).  Roy Verville took office on April 12, 2007. She was defeated in the 2008 election.

Roy Verville ran for the Conservative Party of Quebec in the 2012 election.

Electoral record

References

External links
 

People from Verdun, Quebec
Action démocratique du Québec MNAs
1961 births
Living people
Women MNAs in Quebec
21st-century Canadian politicians
21st-century Canadian women politicians